Volchno-Burlinskoye is a rural locality (a selo) and the administrative center of Volchno-Burlinsky Selsoviet, Krutikhinsky District, Altai Krai, Russia. The population was 1,266 as of 2013. There are 9 streets.

Geography 
Volchno-Burlinskoye is located 36 km northwest of Krutikha (the district's administrative centre) by road. Malovolchanka is the nearest rural locality.

References 

Rural localities in Krutikhinsky District